Quttiktuq is a territorial electoral district (riding) for the Legislative Assembly of Nunavut, Canada.

The riding consists of the communities of Arctic Bay, Grise Fiord, Nanisivik and Resolute.

Election results

1999 election

2000 by-election

2004 election

2008 election

2013 election

2017 election

References

External links
The Legislative Assembly of Nunavut

Electoral districts of Qikiqtaaluk Region
1999 establishments in Nunavut